Let the Love Begin is a 2015 Philippine television drama romance comedy series broadcast by GMA Network. The series is based on a 2005 Philippine film of the same title. Directed by Gina Alajar, it stars Ruru Madrid and Gabbi Garcia. It premiered on May 4, 2015 on the network's Telebabad line up replacing Once Upon a Kiss. The series concluded on August 7, 2015 with a total of 70 episodes. It was replaced by Beautiful Strangers in its timeslot.

The series is streaming online on YouTube.

Premise
Erick and Pia were childhood friends and got separated due to their parents' arguments. They will meet again as teenagers, with Erick eventually falling in love with Pia. When Pia's stepmother, Celeste, and Luchie torture Pia and her family, it leads to the both of them deciding to end their relationship.

Cast and characters

Lead cast
 Ruru Madrid as Frederick "Erick" M. Pontenciano / DJ 1D
 Gabbi Garcia as Sophia Alexandra "Pia" V. Sta. Maria

Supporting cast
 Ai-Ai delas Alas as Jenina "Jeni" Magtanggol-Pontenciano / DJ Pabebeyoncé
 Ar Angel Aviles as Elsa Pontenciano
 Gina Pareño as Maria Anastacia "Tacing" Magtanggol
 Gardo Versoza as Antonio "Tony" Sta. Maria / DJ Tony
 Donita Rose as Celeste Estuar-Dela Vega
 Rita De Guzman as Luchie Estuar-Dela Vega
 Mark Anthony Fernandez as Jose Marie Quinto / DJ Jom
 Gladys Reyes as Katrina Fernandez / DJ Katy Fairy
 Neil Ryan Sese as DJ Jesse
 Noel Trinidad as Milton Villasanta
 Phytos Ramirez as Rafael "Uno" Fernandez / fake DJ 1D
 Therese Malvar as Lily
 Rhen Escaño as Connie
 Abel Estanislao as Makoy
 Sancho Vito Delas Alas as Caloy
 Nomer Limatog as Jules
 Rob Sy as Alex
 Vince Gamad as Danny
 Lucho Ayala as Edison
 Kenneth Paul Cruz as Michael
 Ricardo Cepeda as Rodney
 Joko Diaz as Enrico
 Angeli Bayani as Eds

Guest cast
 Rich Asuncion as Melissa Magtanggol-Pontenciano
 Rita Avila as Sofia "Sofie" Villasanta-Sta. Maria
 Polo Ravales as Francisco "Kiko" Estuar-Dela Vega 
 Joyce Burton as Victoria Estuar 
 Andre Paras as Bradley "Brad" Castillo (a character from The Half Sisters)

Ratings
According to AGB Nielsen Philippines' Mega Manila household television ratings, the pilot episode of Let the Love Begin earned a 19.7% rating. While the final episode scored a 22.1% rating which is the series' highest rating.

Accolades

References

External links
 
 

2015 Philippine television series debuts
2015 Philippine television series endings
Filipino-language television shows
GMA Network drama series
Live action television shows based on films
Philippine romantic comedy television series
Television shows set in Quezon City